Adam Ferguson (1723–1816), Scottish philosopher and historian, "the father of modern sociology".

Adam Ferguson may also refer to:

 Sir Adam Ferguson (British Army officer) (1771–1855), his son, keeper of the regalia in Scotland
Adam Ferguson (photographer) (born 1978), Australian freelance photojournalist

See also
Adam Fergusson (disambiguation)